The University of Health Sciences is a state university in Turkey established in 2015. It is the country's only higher educational institution for health sciences. As of 2019, the rector of the university is Prof. Dr. Cevdet Erdöl.

History
The University of Health Sciences (SBÜ) was established as a state university on 27 March 2015. The Haydarpaşa Campus of the Marmara University at Haydarpaşa neighborhood of Kadıköy in Istanbul was allocated to the SBÜ on 15 April 2015. The Haydarpaşa Campus of the university was named "Mekteb-i Tıbbiyye-i Şahane Külliyesi" ("Imperial School of Medicine Campus") to honor the original name of the building.

In August 2016, "Gülhane Askeri Tıp Akademisi" ("Gülhane Military Medical Academy") in Etlik, Ankara was incorporated into the University of Health Sciences by lifting its military status.

The university began its education in the 2016–17 academic year with 82 students in medicine.

Hamidiye Campus, Istanbul

The construction of the Haydarpaşa Campus building was ordered by Ottoman Sultan Abdul Hamid II (reigned 1876–1909) in 1894. The building was designed by the architects French-Ottoman Alexander Vallaury (1850–1921) and Italian Raimondo D'Aronco (1857–1932).

The opening of the School of Medicine, named  (literally: "Imperial School of Medicine"), took place by the sultan on his birthday on 6 November 1903. While the building hosted the Military Medicine School until 1909, it later served for a civilian Medicine School. It had a botanic garden with medicinal plants. It featured faculties of medicine and pharmacy. The school had an underground tunnel connection to the military hospital across it.

In 1933, with the reorganization of the higher education in Turkey after the Atatürk's Reforms, the Medicine School was closed. The building was allocated to the Haydarpaşa High School. From 1983 on, the building was used by the Marmara University as a campus including also a Faculty of Medicine.

All faculties, colleges and institutes situated at the Haydarpaşa Campus were prefixed "Hamidiye" by a presidential decree in June 2019 after Abdul Hamid II, the founder  of the initial medical school.

Gülhane Campus, Ankara
In 1897, a protocol was signed with the German Empire to improve the medicine education in the Ottoman Empire. Prof. Robert Rieder of University of Bonn and Dr. Georg Deycke of the University Medical Center Hamburg-Eppendorf came to Istanbul in 1898. In addition to their works at the Imperial School of Medicine, they converted the building of the military junior high school inside Gülhane (literally: Rose Garden), the courtyard of Ottoman sultan's Topkapı Palace, into a modern healthcare facility. It was opened on 30 December 1898 and named "Gülhane Seririyat Hastanesi" ("Gülhane Clinic Hospital").

Gülhane Hospital's first active presence took place in 1909 when its physicians, who were transferred to the newly established Faculty of Medicine, made out the majority of the academic staff. During World War I, the hospital undertook important duties in the successful delivery of health services to the Ottoman Army, and in the treatment of wounded soldiers brought from the Battle of Gallipoli (1915–1916). During the occupation of Istanbul from 1918 to 1923, Gülhane Hospital was transferred to Gümüşsuyu quarter of Beyoğlu, Istanbul, and continued to serve during the Turkish War of Independence (1919–1922). Following the end of the occupation of Istanbul, the hospital returned to its previous location.

With the beginning of World War II, it was decided to move the hospital to Ankara. In 1941, it started as "Gülhane Askeri Tababet Okulu ve Hastanesi" ("Gulhane Military Medical School and Hospital") in the buildings of the military hospital at Cebeci quarter of Çankata district of Ankara. Iy played an important role in the establishment of Ankara University Medical School in 1945. Eleven of the fourteen professors and founding staff members originated from the Gulhane Military Medical School and Hospital. In 1947, it was renamed to "Gülhane Askeri Tıp Akademisi" (GATA) ("Gülhane Military Medical Academy"), and collaborated with the Ankara University's Medical School until 1952.

In 1952, the Academy moved from Cebeci to Bahçelievler, Ankara leaving its buildings to the university's Medical School. As the buildings became insufficient, it was decided in 1963 to build a modern hospital complex in  Etlik neighborhood of Keçiören, Ankara. In 1971, the Academy moved into its new location.

After the 2016 Turkish coup d'état attempt on 15 July, all of the 32 military hospitals, including the GATA, were transferred from the  Ministry of National Defense to the Ministry of Health in August the same year. The GATA was renamed "Gülhane Eğitim ve Araştırma Hastanesi" ("Gülhane Education and Research Hospital"), and was incorporated into the SBÜ by a presidential decree.

Academics

Hamidiye Campus
The academic units situated at the Hamidiye Campus in Haydarpaşa, Istanbul are:
 Faculty of Medicine
 Faculty of Dentistry
 Faculty of Pharmacy
 Faculty of Nursing
 Faculty of Health Sciences
 Faculty of International Medicine
 Faculty of Life Sciences
 Institute of Health Sciences
 Institute of Sports Health and Sports Science.

Gülhane Campus
Following academic units serve at the Gülhane Campus in Etlik, Ankara:
 Faculty of Medicine
 Faculty of Dentistry
 Faculty of Pharmacy
 Faculty of Nursing
 Faculty of Health Sciences.

References

Notes

2015 establishments in Turkey
Health Sciences
Health Sciences
Universities established in the 2010s
Universities and colleges in Istanbul
Education in Istanbul
Kadıköy
Universities and colleges in Ankara
Education in Ankara
Keçiören